Mouse-like hamsters are a group of small rodents found in Syria, Azerbaijan, Iran, Turkmenistan, Afghanistan, and Pakistan. They are found in rocky outcrops and semi-mountainous areas in desert regions.

The mouse-like hamsters are not true hamsters, but represent an early split from the rest of the mouse-like rodents.  They were once thought to be hamsters based on the shape of their molars, but they lack the cheek pouches, flank glands and short tails of the true hamsters. The closest relatives of the mouse-like hamsters may be the extinct Cricetodontidae. Because of their seemingly early break from the rest of the mouse-like rodents, mouse-like hamsters have been placed in a family of their own, Calomyscidae, and have been referred to as living fossils.

All members of the genus were once considered part of the same species, Calomyscus bailwardi, but the two are now referred to as separate species due to major differences in chromosome number, skull measurements, and other features.

In Europe, a species of Calomyscus is available as a pet. They are labelled Calomyscus bailwardi mystax or Calomyscus bailwardi. They are generally only available from dedicated breeders, not pet shops.

Species
Family Calomyscidae
Genus Calomyscus
Zagros Mountains mouse-like hamster, C. bailwardi
Baluchi mouse-like hamster, C. baluchi
Goodwin's mouse-like hamster, C. elburzensis
Zykov's mouse-like hamster, C.  e. zykovi
Noble mouse-like hamster, C. grandis
Hotson's mouse-like hamster, C. hotsoni
Great Balkhan mouse-like hamster, C. mystax
Tsolov's mouse-like hamster, C. tsolovi
Urar mouse-like hamster, C. urartensis
Behzad's mouse-like hamster, C. behzadi

References

Jansa, S. A. and M. Weksler. 2004. Phylogeny of muroid rodents: relationships within and among major lineages as determined by IRBP gene sequences.  Molecular Phylogenetics and Evolution, 31:256-276.
Michaux, J., A. Reyes, and F. Catzeflis. 2001. Evolutionary history of the most speciose mammals: molecular phylogeny of muroid rodents. Molecular Biology and Evolution, 17:280-293.
Musser, G. G. and M. D. Carleton. 2005. Superfamily Muroidea. pp. 894–1531 in Mammal Species of the World a Taxonomic and Geographic Reference. D. E. Wilson and D. M. Reeder eds. Johns Hopkins University Press, Baltimore.

External links 

 Animal Diversity Web: Detailed description
 Photos of the Turkmen Mouse-like hamster (German page)

Muroid rodents

Mammals of Pakistan
Mammals of Western Asia
Mammals of Central Asia
Extant Miocene first appearances
Taxa named by Oldfield Thomas